Paula Weinstein (November 19, 1945) is an American film and TV producer.

Biography
Weinstein was raised in a Jewish family, the daughter of television producer Hannah Weinstein (née Dorner) and Pete Weinstein, a reporter for The Brooklyn Eagle; her parents divorced in 1955. She was married to producer Mark Rosenberg until his death in 1992 at age 44. She often works with Steve Kloves, Lasse Hallström, and Barry Levinson.

In 2013, Weinstein has been named the Executive Vice President of Tribeca Enterprises.

Filmography 
She was a producer in all films unless otherwise noted.

Film

Thanks

Television

References

External links 
 

American film producers
American television producers
Place of birth missing (living people)
American women television producers
Living people
American women film producers
1945 births
21st-century American women
Primetime Emmy Award winners